Filimonovy Gari is a rural locality (a village) in Baydarovskoye Rural Settlement, Nikolsky District, Vologda Oblast, Russia. The population was 38 as of 2002.

Geography 
Filimonovy Gari is located 22 km northeast of Nikolsk (the district's administrative centre) by road. Zaymishche is the nearest rural locality.

References 

Rural localities in Nikolsky District, Vologda Oblast